This is a list of cybersecurity information technology. Cybersecurity is security as it is applied to information technology. This includes all technology that stores, manipulates, or moves data, such as computers, data networks, and all devices connected to or included in networks, such as routers and switches. All information technology devices and facilities need to be secured against intrusion, unauthorized use, and vandalism. Additionally, the users of information technology should be protected from theft of assets, extortion, identity theft, loss of privacy and confidentiality of personal information, malicious mischief, damage to equipment, business process compromise, and the general activity of cybercriminals. The public should be protected against acts of cyberterrorism, such as the compromise or loss of the electric power grid.

Cybersecurity is a major endeavor in the IT industry. There are a number of professional certifications given for cybersecurity training and expertise. Although billions of dollars are spent annually on cybersecurity, no computer or network is immune from attacks or can be considered completely secure.  The single most expensive loss due to a cybersecurity exploit was the ILOVEYOU or Love Bug email worm of 2000, which cost an estimated 10 billion dollars.

This article attempts to list all the important Wikipedia articles about cybersecurity. There are a number of minor articles that can be reached by means of links in the listed articles.

General 
Introductory articles about cybersecurity subjects:

 Security
 Computer security
 Internet security
 Network security
 Information security, Data security
 List of computer security certifications

Cryptography 
The art of secret writing or code. A "plaintext" message is converted by the sender to "ciphertext" by means of a mathematical algorithm that uses a secret key. The receiver of the message then reverses the process and converts the ciphertext back to the original plaintext.

 History of cryptography
 Enigma machine
 Alan Turing
 Cipher
 Substitution cipher
 One-time pad
 Beale ciphers
 The Codebreakers
 Cryptanalysis
 Cryptographic primitive
 Cryptographic Service Provider
 Data Encryption Standard
 Advanced Encryption Standard
 International Data Encryption Algorithm
 HMAC
 HMAC-based One-time Password algorithm
 Cryptographic hash function
 Hash collision
 List of hash functions
 Comparison of cryptographic hash functions
 Hash-based cryptography
 SHA-1
 SHA-2
 SHA-3
 SHA-3 competition
 Cryptographic nonce
 Salt (cryptography)
 Cryptographic strength
 Block cipher
 Block cipher mode of operation
 Stream cipher
 Key (cryptography)
 Key size
 Cryptographic key types
 Symmetric-key algorithm
 Public-key cryptography
 Public-Key Cryptography (conference)
 Digital signature
 Non-repudiation
 Public key certificate
 Certificate authority
 X.509
 Public key fingerprint
 RSA (cryptosystem)
 Secret sharing
 Internet key exchange
 Pretty Good Privacy
 Strong cryptography

Steganography 
The art of hidden writing. The secret message is hidden within another object, such as a digital photograph.

 Steganography
 BPCS-Steganography
 Steganography tools
 Steganalysis
 OpenPuff
 Kristie Macrakis

Authentication and access 
The process by which a potential client is granted authorized use of an IT facility by proving its identity.

 Authentication
 Login
 Password
 Passphrase
 Password strength
 One-time password
 Multi-factor authentication
 Identity management
 Identity management theory
 Identity management system
 Encrypting PIN Pad
 Shared secret
 Authorization
 Access control
 Principle of least privilege
 Cryptographic protocol
 Authentication protocol
 Public key infrastructure
 RADIUS
 Kerberos (protocol)
 OpenID
 OAuth
 Active Directory Federation Services
 Security Assertion Markup Language
 SAML-based products and services

Public Key Infrastructure (PKI) 
A framework for managing digital certificates and encryption keys.

 Public key infrastructure
 X.509
 Root certificate
 Public key certificate
 Certificate authority
 Digital signature
 Certificate policy
 Certificate Practice Statement
 Certificate revocation list
 Online Certificate Status Protocol

Tools 
Computerized utilities designed to study and analyze the security of IT facilities and/or break into them on an unauthorized and potentially criminal basis.

 List of security assessment tools
 Kali
 Security Administrator Tool for Analyzing Networks
 Nessus (software)
 Vulnerability scanner
 Nessus Attack Scripting Language
 OpenVAS
 Yasca
 Metasploit project
 John the Ripper
 Smeg Virus Construction Kit
 Virus Creation Laboratory
 Exploit kit

Threats 
Modes of potential attacks on IT facilities.

 Cyberattack
 STRIDE (security)
 Vulnerability (computing)
 Common Vulnerabilities and Exposures
 Privilege escalation
 Social engineering (security)
 Malware
 Spyware
 Backdoor (computing)
 Computer virus
 Computer worm
 Macro virus
 Keystroke logging
 Trojan horse
 Hardware Trojan
 Eavesdropping
 Zombie
 Botnets
 Advanced persistent threat
 Man-in-the-middle attack
 Man-on-the-side attack
 Meet-in-the-middle attack
 Length extension attack
 Replay attack
 Pre-play attack
 Dictionary attack
 Biclique attack
 Denial-of-service attack
 Resource exhaustion attack
 Brute-force attack
 Watermarking attack
 Mangled packet
 Reverse connection
 Polymorphic code
 Password cracking
 Spoofing attack
 POODLE

Exploits 
Violations of IT facilities.

 Exploit (computer security)
 Timeline of computer viruses and worms
 Comparison of computer viruses
 Malware analysis
 XML denial-of-service attack
 Distributed denial-of-service attacks on root nameservers
 Linux malware
 Zero-day (computing)
 Virus hoax
 Pegasus
 Rogue security software
 List of rogue security software
 MS Antivirus (malware)
 AntiVirus Gold
 Spysheriff
 SpywareBot
 TheSpyBot
 ByteDefender
 Security Essentials 2010
 Email spam
 Phishing
 Tiny Banker Trojan
 Melissa (computer virus)
 Brain (computer virus)
 CIH (computer virus)
 ILOVEYOU
 Anna Kournikova (computer virus)
 Michelangelo (computer virus)
 Simile (computer virus)
 Stoned (computer virus)
 Acme (computer virus)
 AIDS (computer virus)
 AI (computer virus)
 Cascade (computer virus)
 Flame (computer virus)
 Abraxas (computer virus)
 1260 (computer virus)
 SCA (computer virus)
 ReDoS
 SYN flood
 Billion laughs attack
 UDP flood attack
 Wi-Fi deauthentication attack
 Smurf attack
 Mydoom
 IP address spoofing
 Fork bomb
 WinNuke

Criminal activity 
Violation of the law by means of breaking into and/or misusing IT facilities. Laws that attempt to prevent these crimes.

 Computer misuse act
 Cyber-security regulation
 China Internet Security Law
 Computer Crime and Intellectual Property Section
 Cyber criminals
 Cybercrime
 Security hacker
 White hat (computer security)
 Black hat (computer security)
 Industrial espionage#Use of computers and the Internet
 Phreaking
 RDP shop
 Market for zero-day exploits
 2600 magazine
 Phrack, Google search on “hacker magazine”
 Identity theft
 Identity fraud
 Cyberstalking
 Cyberbullying

Nation states 
Countries and their governments that use, misuse, and/or violate IT facilities to achieve national goals.

 Cyber-arms industry
 Computer and network surveillance
 List of government surveillance projects
 Clipper chip
 Targeted surveillance
 United States Cyber Command
 Cybersecurity and Infrastructure Security Agency
 National Cybersecurity and Communications Integration Center
 Bletchley Park
 NSO Group
 Hacking Team
 Unit 8200
 NSA
 Room 641A
 Narus (company)
 Equation group
 Tailored Access Operations
 XKeyscore
 PRISM (surveillance program)
 Stuxnet
 Carnivore (software)

End-point protection 
The securing of networked computers, mobile devices and terminals.

 Antivirus software
 Comparison of antivirus software
 Lookout (IT security)
 Windows Defender
 Kaspersky Lab
 Malwarebytes
 Avast Antivirus
 Norton AntiVirus
 AVG AntiVirus
 McAfee
 McAfee VirusScan
 Symantec Endpoint Protection
 Microsoft Safety Scanner
 Windows Malicious Software Removal Tool
 VirusTotal
 Application firewall
 Personal firewall
 SentinelOne

Network protection 
The protection of the means by which data is moved from one IT facility to another.

 Virtual private network
 IPsec
 Internet Key Exchange
 Internet Security Association and Key Management Protocol
 Kerberized Internet Negotiation of Keys
 Firewall (computing)
 Stateful firewall
 HTTPS
 HTTP Public Key Pinning
 Transport Layer Security
 TLS acceleration
 Network Security Services
 Off the record messaging
 Secure Shell
 Circuit-level gateway
 Intrusion detection system
 Intrusion Detection Message Exchange Format
 Security information management
 Security information and event management
 Security event manager
 Router (computing)#Security
 Security log
 Intranet#Enterprise private network
 Proxy server

Processing protection 
The securing of IT facilities that manipulate data, such as computer servers, often by means of specialized cybersecurity hardware.

 Hardware security module
 Secure cryptoprocessor
 Trusted Platform Module
 Unified Extensible Firmware Interface#Secure Boot
 Executable space protection

Storage protection 
The protection of data in its non-moving state, usually on magnetic or optical media or in computer memory.

 Disk encryption
 Disk encryption theory
 Disk encryption software
 Comparison of disk encryption software
 BitLocker
 Encrypting File System
 Filesystem-level encryption
 Disk encryption hardware
 Hardware-based full disk encryption
 Personal data
 General Data Protection Regulation
 Privacy policy
 Information security audit
 Information technology audit
 Information technology security audit

Management of security 
The processes by which security technology is monitored for faults, deployed and configured, measured for its usage, queried for performance metrics and log files, and/or monitored for intrusions.

 Information security management
 FCAPS#Security management

Standards, frameworks, & requirements 
Officially agreed architectures and conceptual structures for designing, building, and conducting cybersecurity.

 NIST Cybersecurity Framework
 National Initiative for Cybersecurity Education
 Center for Internet Security
 The CIS Critical Security Controls for Effective Cyber Defense
 Cyber Risk Quantification
 Risk management framework
 IT risk
 Risk IT
 ISO/IEC 27000-series
 Cyber-security regulation
 Health Insurance Portability and Accountability Act#Security Rule
 Federal Information Security Management Act of 2002

See also 

 Outline of computer security
https://witslb.com/

Cybersecurity KB

References 

Information technology
Internet security